Stewart Lake Water Aerodrome  is located on Stewart Lake, Ontario, Canada.

References

Registered aerodromes in Kenora District
Seaplane bases in Ontario